Bedlam: London and Its Mad is a 2008 book by the British journalist Catharine Arnold.

Synopsis
The book follow developments in societal treatment of mental illness and the mentally ill, from the cruel days of Bethlem Hospital (often known as "Bedlam") to the campaigning psychiatrists who secured advances in treatment and changes in societal viewpoints.

Reception
In The Guardian, Patrick McGrath made some criticisms of the book, arguing "Arnold occasionally makes wild claims", but notes that the strength of the book is "the author indulges all that is quirky and macabre in the fascinating story of madness in England". The Psychiatric Times was rather more critical, with the reviewer writing "Is Bedlam accurate, historically reliable, and of academic and therapeutic value? I think not", and "In the final page of the book, we discover that 'over the years, [the author has] learned to embrace melancholy', and 'some of us prefer to endure melancholy in its various manifestations and accept that this variety of madness is part of our identity. A 'Government Health Warning' should accompany this frank, therapeutic nihilism and negativity toward psychiatric treatment".

References

2008 non-fiction books
Books about London
Books about mental health
Books by Catharine Arnold
English-language books
English non-fiction books
History books about London
History of mental health in the United Kingdom